Sir Harry Seymour Foster (29 April 1855 - 20 June 1938) was a British Conservative Party politician who served as a Member of Parliament (MP) for three non-consecutive periods between 1892 and 1929.

He was the second son of Samuel Green Foster of London.

He was a Justice of the Peace and Deputy Lieutenant for Suffolk, and in the Commission of Lieutenancy for the City of London, where he was appointed a Sheriff of London for 1891. He was Consul-General of Persia from 1892 to 1923.

He was elected at the 1892 general election as MP for the Lowestoft division of Suffolk. He was re-elected in 1895, but did not defend his seat at the general election in 1900.  He stood again at the January 1910 election, regaining the seat from the Edward Beauchamp, the Liberal who had won it in 1906. Foster's return to the House of Commons was short, as Beauchamp retook the seat at the December 1910 election.

After his defeat in 1910, Foster did not stand again until the 1924 general election, when he was selected as the Conservative candidate to replace Sir Thomas Bramsdon in Portsmouth Central. He won the seat, but stood down from Parliament at the 1929 general election.

He was a party in Foster v Driscoll [1929] 1 KB 470 involving a contract for the supply of whisky to the US during the prohibition era.   The English courts refused to enforce the contract (even though governed by and lawful under English law), as its performance was unlawful under the law of the place of intended performance.

He married Amy, the daughter of John Sparks of Eastbourne and had 3 sons and 3 daughters.

References

External links 
 

1855 births
1938 deaths
Deputy Lieutenants of Suffolk
Conservative Party (UK) MPs for English constituencies
UK MPs 1892–1895
UK MPs 1895–1900
UK MPs 1910
UK MPs 1924–1929
Sheriffs of the City of London
Members of London County Council
Members of the London School Board